Sergio Corrieri (3 March 1939 – 29 February 2008) was a Cuban actor. He won the award for Best Actor at the 8th Moscow International Film Festival for his role in The Man from Maisinicu.

Corrieri was centrally involved with the Cuban Institute of Cinematographic Art and Industry (ICAIC) from its foundation in 1959. He was also a member of the Central Committee of the Communist Party of Cuba from 1980, and was made head of culture within the Central Committee in 1987. From 1976 he was also and a deputy to the National Assembly of People's Power, and a member of the Council of State in 1998–2003. Corrieri was president of the Cuban Institute of Friendship with the Peoples (ICAP) from 1990 until his death.

Filmography

References

External links

1939 births
2008 deaths
20th-century Cuban male actors
People from Havana
Cuban male film actors